Deer Lake/Keyamawun Water Aerodrome  was located on Deer Lake, Ontario, Canada.

See also
Deer Lake Airport
Deer Lake Water Aerodrome

References

Defunct seaplane bases in Ontario